Dante Maggio (2 March 1909 – 3 March 1992) was an Italian film actor. He appeared in 115 films between 1940 and 1975.

Born in Naples into a family of actors, Maggio had a turbulent adolescence that led his father to send him in an institute for problematic minors. He debuted on stage aged 18 years old. He worked on stage in several sceneggiate and with the companies of Anna Fougez and Raffaele Viviani before creating his own revue company.

Maggio was the brother of actors Enzo, Rosalia, Beniamino and Pupella Maggio.

Selected filmography

 The Palace on the River (1940)
 Un giorno nella vita (1946) - Carlo
 The Ways of Sin (1946) - La guardia carceraria (uncredited)
 The Great Dawn (1947)
 Last Love (1947) - Il partner di Maria
 Tombolo, paradiso nero (1947) - Agostino
 Le avventure di Pinocchio (1947) - Il Gendarme
 The Street Has Many Dreams (1948) - Emilio
 I contrabbandieri del mare (1948) - Paolino
 Il cavaliere misterioso (1948) - Gennaro, il servo di Casanova
 Guarany (1948) - Rossi
 The Firemen of Viggiù (1949) - Fireman from Naples
 The Wolf of the Sila (1949) - Gennaro
 Se fossi deputato (1949)
 Napoli eterna canzone (1949) - Giulio
 Botta e risposta (1950)
 Cavalcade of Heroes (1950) - Ciccillo
 No Peace Under the Olive Tree (1950) - Salvatore Capuano
 Side Street Story (1950) - Il rosticciere
 Father's Dilemma (1950) - Metropolitano che regola il trafico
 His Last Twelve Hours (1950) - Il calzolaio
 Feathers in the Wind (1950) - Gennaro
 47 morto che parla (1950) - Dante Cartoni, il partener de la canzonettista
 Variety Lights (1951) - Remo
 Beauties on Bicycles (1951) - Altro ladro
 Song of Spring (1951) - Gigetto
 Milano miliardaria (1951) - Peppino Avallone
 Trieste mia! (1951)
 Repentance (1952)
 Viva il cinema! (1952) - Ciccillo
 Tragic Return (1952) - Nicola
 The City Stands Trial (1952) - Armando Capezzuto
 In Olden Days (1952) - un testimone
 We're Dancing on the Rainbow (1952) - Gennaro
 Final Pardon (1952)
 Don Lorenzo (1952) - Beniamino
 Delitto al luna park (1952)
 Perdonami! (1953) - Michele
 Siamo ricchi e poveri (1953)
 Lasciateci in pace (1953)
 La pattuglia dell'Amba Alagi (1953) - Ciccillo
 Casta Diva (1954) - Il pazzariello
 The Captain of Venice (1954) - Papele Scaramuzza
 La città canora (1954) - Pasquale
 Il grande addio (1954)
 Napoli piange e ride (1954) - Ciccillo
 Goodbye Naples (1955) - Pasquale
 Il cantante misterioso (1955) - Gennaro
 Toto in Hell (1955) - Pacifico
 Carovana di canzoni (1955) - Lord Mister
 La rossa (1955) - Maggiolino - il barbiere
 The Song of the Heart (1955) - Carletto, il giardiniere
 Scapricciatiello (1955) - Gennarino - Barber
 Songs of Italy (1955)
 Incatenata dal destino (1956) - Chitarrista
 Canzone proibita (1956) - Dante
 Occhi senza luce (1956) - Dante
 Mamma sconosciuta (1956) - Dante
 Cantando sotto le stelle (1956)
 Arriva la zia d'America (1956) - Dante
 Sette canzoni per sette sorelle (1957) - Don Ciccillo
 La canzone del destino (1957)
 C'è un sentiero nel cielo (1957) - Gennaro Percuoco
 The Lady Doctor (1957) - Un cameriere
 La zia d'America va a sciare (1957) - Dante
 Buongiorno primo amore! (1957) - Zio Gaetano
 Non sono più Guaglione (1958) - Don Pasqualino - Vincenzino's employer
 Quando gli angeli piangono (1958)
 Captain Falcon (1958) - Civetta
 Sorrisi e canzoni (1958) - Gennarino
 Mia nonna poliziotto (1958) - Padre di Ileana
 Ferdinando I° re di Napoli (1959)
 David and Goliath (1960) - Cret
 Pesci d'oro e bikini d'argento (1961)
 Boccaccio '70 (1962) - Foreman (segment "Le tentazioni del dottor Antonio") (uncredited)
 Toto and Peppino Divided in Berlin (1962) - Un magliaro
 Twist, lolite e vitelloni (1962) - Leone Remigi
 Rififi in Tokyo (1963)
 Siamo tutti pomicioni (1963) - Napoli - the host in the nightclub (segment "Pomicioni di provincia")
 The Visit (1964) - Cadek
 Bullet in the Flesh (1964) - Cliente bar
 Tears on Your Face (1964)
 Saul e David (1964) - Abdon
 Revenge of The Gladiators (1964) - Ubriaco nella taverna
 For a Few Dollars More (1965) - carpenter in cell with El Indio
 30 Winchester per El Diablo (1965) - Billy - telegrapher 
 3 colpi di Winchester per Ringo (1966) - Walcom Partner
 Un gangster venuto da Brooklyn (1966)
 Treasure Island (1966-1967, TV Mini-Series) - Bill Bones
 Treasure of San Gennaro (1966) - A Captain
 Ballad of a Gunman (1967) - Explosion / Esplotion / 'Knallfrosch'
 Wanted Johnny Texas (1967) - Sam More
 Operation St. Peter's (1967) - The Captain
 Comandamenti per un gangster (1968) - Old Man
 Caprice Italian Style (1968) - (segment "Mostro della domenica, Il")
 Anzio (1968) - Neapolitan street hawker (uncredited)
 May God Forgive You... But I Won't (1968) - Joe - Bartender
 Run, Man, Run (1968) - Mateos Gonzalez 
 I 2 pompieri (1968) - Megatone
 Italiani! È severamente proibito servirsi della toilette durante le fermate (1969)
 A Sword for Brando (1970)
 Pray to Kill and Return Alive (1971) - Jonathan
 Black Killer (1971) - Judge Wilson
 Holy Water Joe (1971) - The Banker
 My Dear Killer (1972) - Mattia Guardapelle
 Trinità e Sartana figli di... (1972) - Bud Benny Bud 
 Man Called Amen (1972) - Professor
 100 Fäuste und ein Vaterunser (1972) - The General 
 Holy God, Here Comes the Passatore! (1973) - Prelato derubato
 Sentivano uno strano, eccitante, pericoloso puzzo di dollari (1973)
 Ci risiamo, vero Provvidenza? (1973) - Judge
 The Five Days (1973) - Old man in jail (uncredited)
 Oremus, Alleluia e Così Sia (1973)
 The Fighting Fist of Shanghai Joe (1973) - Doctor
 Long Lasting Days (1973) - 'Uncle' Giuseppe
 Di Tresette ce n'è uno, tutti gli altri son nessuno (1974) - Drakeman

References

External links

1909 births
1992 deaths
Italian male film actors
Male actors from Naples
20th-century Italian male actors
Male Spaghetti Western actors